Charlton Tshuma (born 19 April 1993) is a Zimbabwean cricketer. He made his List A debut for Matabeleland Tuskers in the 2018–19 Pro50 Championship on 23 February 2019. He made his Twenty20 debut for Matabeleland Tuskers in the 2018–19 Stanbic Bank 20 Series on 14 March 2019.

In January 2020, he was named in Zimbabwe's Test squad for their series against Sri Lanka, but he did not play. The following month, he was again named in Zimbabwe's Test squad, this time for their one-off Test against Bangladesh. He made his Test debut for Zimbabwe, against Bangladesh, on 22 February 2020. He was also named in Zimbabwe's One Day International (ODI) and Twenty20 International (T20I) squads for the matches against Bangladesh. He made his ODI debut for Zimbabwe, against Bangladesh, on 3 March 2020. He made his T20I debut for Zimbabwe, also against Bangladesh, on 11 March 2020.

In December 2020, he was selected to play for the Tuskers in the 2020–21 Logan Cup.

References

External links
 

1993 births
Living people
Zimbabwean cricketers
Zimbabwe Test cricketers
Zimbabwe One Day International cricketers
Zimbabwe Twenty20 International cricketers
Matabeleland Tuskers cricketers
Rangers cricketers
Place of birth missing (living people)